The red-legged honeycreeper (Cyanerpes cyaneus) is a small songbird species in the tanager family (Thraupidae). It is found in the tropical New World from southern Mexico south to Peru, Bolivia and central Brazil, Trinidad and Tobago, and on Cuba, where possibly introduced. It is also rarely found in southern Texas.

Taxonomy
The red-legged honeycreeper was formally described by the Swedish naturalist Carl Linnaeus in 1766 in the twelfth edition of his Systema Naturae under the binomial name Certhia cyanea. Linnaeus based his description on "The Black and Blue Creeper" that had been described and illustrated in 1760 by the English naturalist George Edwards from a specimen collected in Suriname. The red-legged honeycreeper is now placed in the genus Cyanerpes that was introduced in 1899 by the American ornithologist Harry C. Oberholser. The specific epithet cyaneus is a Latin word meaning "dark-blue".

Eleven subspecies are recognised:
 C. c. carneipes (Sclater, PL, 1860) – east Mexico to Panama
 C. c. pacificus Chapman, 1915 – west Colombia and w Ecuador
 C. c. gigas Thayer & Bangs, 1905 – Gorgona Island (off west Colombia)
 C. c. gemmeus Wetmore, 1941 – extreme north Colombia
 C. c. eximius (Cabanis, 1851) – north, north-central Colombia to north Venezuela
 C. c. tobagensis Hellmayr & Seilern, 1914 – Tobago
 C. c. cyaneus (Linnaeus, 1766) – Trinidad, east Venezuela, the Guianas and north Brazil
 C. c. dispar Zimmer, JT, 1942 – southeast Colombia and southwest Venezuela to northeast Peru
 C. c. violaceus Zimmer, JT, 1942 – southeast Peru and west Brazil to central Bolivia
 C. c. brevipes (Cabanis, 1851) – central Brazil
 C. c. holti Parkes, 1977 – east Brazil

Description
The male is violet-blue with black wings, tail and back, and bright red legs. The crown of its head is turquoise, and the underwing, visible only in flight, is lemon yellow. After the breeding season, the male moults into an eclipse plumage, mainly greenish with black wings.

Females and immatures are mainly green, with paler, faintly streaked underparts. The legs are red-brown in the female, and brown in young birds.

The call of red-legged honeycreeper is a thin, high-pitched tsip.

Several subspecies are known. Differences are generally slight, with the Tobago race  C. c. tobagensis being slightly larger than the mainland forms for example.

The purplish honeycreeper (Chlorophanes purpurascens), a bird from Venezuela known only from the type specimen, is considered to be an intergeneric hybrid between the green honeycreeper and either the red-legged honeycreeper or the blue dacnis.

Distribution and habitat
This is a species of forest edge, open woodland, and cocoa and citrus plantations. The red-legged honeycreeper is often found in small groups. It feeds on insects and some seeds, fruit and nectar. It responds readily to the (easily imitated) call of the ferruginous pygmy owl (Glaucidium brasilianum).

Behaviour and ecology

Breeding
In Costa Rica red-legged honeycreepers generally breed between April and June. The nest is built entirely by the female and is placed in a shrub or tree several meters above the ground. The cup-shaped nest has thin side walls and is formed of stiff fibres. It is attached to the supporting twigs with cobwebs. The clutch consists of two eggs that are laid in early morning on consecutive days. The female incubates the eggs for 12 or 13 days. When they first hatch the nestlings have their eyes closed and are covered with tuffs of grey down. They are brooded by the female but fed by both parents. They fledge after around 14 days.

A specimen studied in the Parque Nacional de La Macarena of Colombia was found to be free of blood parasites.

Common and widespread, the red-legged honeycreeper is not considered a threatened species by the IUCN.

Gallery

References

External links

 
 Red-legged honeycreeper Stamps from British Honduras (now Belize), Costa Rica, Nicaragua, Paraguay & Suriname at bird-stamps.org
 
 Trip Report from birdtours.co.uk featuring a Red-legged honeycreeper photo
 
 
 

red-legged honeycreeper
Birds of Central America
Birds of Colombia
Birds of Venezuela
Birds of Trinidad and Tobago
Birds of the Caribbean
Birds of the Guianas
Birds of the Amazon Basin
Birds of the Atlantic Forest
red-legged honeycreeper
red-legged honeycreeper